Larner Somers Gardner Conover  (May 21, 1894 – August 4, 1945) was a professional American football player who played during the early years of the National Football League (NFL). After attending high school in Atlantic City, New Jersey, Conover attended Penn State University, where he served as the team's captain in 1917.  Conover was the head basketball coach at Clemson for the 1920–21 season.

Nicknamed "The Atlantic City Airedale", Conovar made his professional debut in the NFL in 1921 with the Canton Bulldogs. Conover played in the league for four years, playing for the Cleveland Bulldogs, Frankford Yellow Jackets and Canton.  In 1922, Conover signed on to play with the then-independent, Pottsville Maroons. There he helped the Maroons become the top team in the Pennsylvania coal region. In 1924, the Maroons won the Anthracite League championship.  The following year, the Maroons joined the NFL.

Conover later served as a line coach at the University of Georgia and as an assistant football coach his alma mater, Penn State, from 1926 to 1932.  He died on August 4, 1945, in Atlantic City, New Jersey, from a heart attack after attempting to revive a drowned swimmer.

References

1894 births
1945 deaths
American football centers
Basketball coaches from New Jersey
Canton Bulldogs players
Clemson Tigers football coaches
Clemson Tigers men's basketball coaches
Cleveland Bulldogs players
Frankford Yellow Jackets players
Georgia Bulldogs football coaches
Penn State Nittany Lions football coaches
Penn State Nittany Lions football players
Pottsville Maroons (Anthracite League) players
Sportspeople from Atlantic City, New Jersey
Players of American football from New Jersey